Nutty, Naughty Chateau is a 1963 French-Italian comedy film directed by Roger Vadim starring Monica Vitti.

Cast
 Monica Vitti as Éléonore
 Curd Jürgens as Hugo Falsen
 Jean-Claude Brialy as Sébastien
 Jean-Louis Trintignant as Éric
 Daniel Emilfork as Gunther
 Suzanne Flon as Agathe
 Françoise Hardy as Ophélie
 Michel Le Royer as  Gosta
 Sylvie as La grand-mère
 Henri Attal as Le policier #1
 Dominique Zardi as Le policier #2

References

External links

Films based on works by Françoise Sagan
Films directed by Roger Vadim
Films produced by Robert Dorfmann
French films based on plays
Films set in Sweden
1960s French films